Divya is a Indian name derived from the Sanskrit word  / , meaning "Divine Brilliance".

Real persons with the first name Divya

Divya Bhatnagar (1986–2020), Indian television actress
Divya Bharti (1974–1993), Bollywood film actress
Divya Chouksey (1990–2020), Indian actress
Divya Desai, Indian actress
Divya Dutta (born 1977), Indian actress
Divya Dwivedi (active from 2006), Indian philosopher
Divya Gopikumar, a South Indian actress known as Abhirami
Divya Kumar (disambiguation), several people
Divya Maderna, Indian politician from Rajasthan
Divya Narendra, CEO of Subzero
Divya Palat, Hindi film actress
Divya Singh, basketball player for the Indian national team
Divya Tewar, Indian judoka
Divya Unni, Malayalam film actress
Divya Venkatasubramaniam, the real name of Kanika Subramaniam, Tamil actress
Divya Victor, Tamil American poet (fl.2009 -)

Fictional characters named Divya
Divya (Sonia Agarwal), the female lead, opposite Dhanush from the movie Kaadhal Kondein.
Divya Rathore (Simran Jehani), sister of the male lead, Fawad Khan from the movie Khoobsurat.
Divya Katdare (Reshma Shetty), a supporting character in the TV series Royal Pains.

References

See also
 Divya

Indian given names